Sierra Brooks is a census-designated place (CDP) in Sierra County, California. The 2010 United States census reported Sierra Brooks's population was 478.

Geography
According to the United States Census Bureau, the CDP covers an area of 1.4 square miles (3.5 km), all of it land.

Demographics
The 2010 United States Census reported that Sierra Brooks had a population of 478. The racial makeup of Sierra Brooks was 466 (97.5%) White, 0 (0.0%) African American, 4 (0.8%) Native American, 1 (0.2%) Asian, 1 (0.2%) Pacific Islander, 0 (0.0%) from other races, and 6 (1.3%) from two or more races. Hispanic or Latino of any race were 22 persons (4.6%).

The Census reported that 478 people (100% of the population) lived in households, 0 (0%) lived in non-institutionalized group quarters, and 0 (0%) were institutionalized.

There were 186 households, out of which 61 (32.8%) had children under the age of 18 living in them, 127 (68.3%) were opposite-sex married couples living together, 12 (6.5%) had a female householder with no husband present, 9 (4.8%) had a male householder with no wife present.  There were 8 (4.3%) unmarried opposite-sex partnerships, and 0 (0%) same-sex married couples or partnerships. 34 households (18.3%) were made up of individuals, and 19 (10.2%) had someone living alone who was 65 years of age or older. The average household size was 2.57.  There were 148 families (79.6% of all households); the average family size was 2.84.

The population was spread out, with 130 people (27.2%) under the age of 18, 12 people (2.5%) aged 18 to 24, 92 people (19.2%) aged 25 to 44, 161 people (33.7%) aged 45 to 64, and 83 people (17.4%) who were 65 years of age or older.  The median age was 45.8 years. For every 100 females, there were 98.3 males.  For every 100 females age 18 and over, there were 93.3 males.

The homeowner vacancy rate was 4.3%; the rental vacancy rate was 0%.  374 people (78.2% of the population) lived in owner-occupied housing units and 104 people (21.8%) lived in rental housing units.

Politics

References

Census-designated places in Sierra County, California
Census-designated places in California